Stoicorum Veterum Fragmenta is a collection by Hans von Arnim of fragments and testimonia of the earlier Stoics, published in 1903–1905 as part of the Bibliotheca Teubneriana. It includes the fragments and testimonia of Zeno of Citium, Chrysippus and their immediate followers. At first the work consisted of three volumes, to which Maximilian Adler in 1924 added a fourth, containing general indices. Teubner reprinted the whole work in 1964.

Division of the work 
 Volume 1 – Fragments of Zeno and his followers
 Volume 2 – Logical and physical fragments of Chrysippus
 Volume 3 – Ethical fragments of Chrysippus and some fragments of his pupils
 Volume 4 – Indices of words, proper names and sources

References

External links 
 Stoicorum Veterum Fragmenta, Volume I (at Stoic Therapy)

Philosophy books
Stoicism
Fragment collections
Ancient Greek philosophy studies
Hellenistic philosophical literature